Thomas Francis Meighan (5 July 1902 – 9 May 1977) was an Australian rugby league footballer who played in 1920s.

Playing career
Originally a fullback from the Newcastle rugby league competition, Frank Meighan trialled with the St. George club in early 1926 and was put under contract. Meighan spent 3 seasons at the Saints before breaking his leg in a trail match in early 1929 which resulted in a premature end to his Sydney career.  He later played for Gunnedah, New South Wales in late 1929 before returning to Newcastle. Meighan later became a funeral director in Newcastle.

Death
Meighan died in 1977 at Newcastle, New South Wales and was buried at Sandgate Cemetery.

References

1902 births
1977 deaths
Australian rugby league players
Rugby league fullbacks
Rugby league players from Newcastle, New South Wales
St. George Dragons players